The Sir Charles Tupper Building has since its completion in 1960 served as the headquarters of the Department of Public Works, now Public Works and Government Services Canada. It also houses some Health Canada operations, notably the headquarters of the Pest Management Regulatory Agency. It was named in honour of the Father of Confederation and sixth Prime Minister of Canada.

The Tupper building is one of the five original facilities making up the Confederation Heights development completed from the late 1950s into the 1960s, in accordance with the Greber Plan to decentralise Federal government functions.

Built in International Style on a large sloping site at Confederation Heights, the Tupper building consists of five thin, interlocking rectangular blocks, four/five stories tall, laid out at right angles in a geometric, stair-like arrangement. While the internal arrangements of the building have changed over time, its outside appearance has remained the same. 

In recognition of its architectural importance, the Sir Charles Tupper building was added to the Canadian Register of Historic Places in 2007.

References

External links

Treasury Board of Canada Inventory - Sir Charles Tupper Building
Sir Charles Tupper Building - Canadian Register of Historic Places (Parks Canada)

Federal government buildings in Ottawa
Government buildings completed in 1960
Modernist architecture in Canada
Office buildings in Canada
1960 establishments in Ontario